George Greaves (20 June 1897 – after 1924) was an English footballer who made 72 appearances in the Football League playing for Lincoln City. He played as a full back. He also played non-league football for Lincoln Rovers, Chesterfield Municipal, Scunthorpe & Lindsey United and Boston Town.

He played a leading role in Wigan Borough's record Football League victory, by nine goals to one. On 3 March 1923, Lincoln were losing 2–0 after half an hour of the visit to Wigan Borough when their goalkeeper, Jack Kendall, was knocked unconscious by the ball rebounding off the frame of the goal and striking him on the back of the head. Kendall was taken to hospital, and Greaves replaced him in goal; he and Lincoln conceded a further seven goals.

References

1897 births
Footballers from Sheffield
English footballers
Association football fullbacks
Chesterfield F.C. players
Lincoln City F.C. players
Scunthorpe United F.C. players
Boston Town F.C. (1920s) players
English Football League players
Year of death missing
Place of death missing